Ledo is a small town in Tinsukia district, Assam, India. , the Ledo railway station is the easternmost broad gauge railway station in India. The town is also the starting point of Ledo Road, also known as Stilwell Road, a highway built during World War II for use by American and British troops as a military supply route to China through Myanmar (Burma)

The first coal mine in Assam was started near Ledo in 1882 when the erstwhile Assam Railway & Trading Company was laying a metre gauge railway line in that region.

Nearest Town and Villages

 Tirap Gaon
 Lekhapani
 Margherita
 Tipong

References

Cities and towns in Tinsukia district